Paula Suominen (born 20 March 1977) is a Finnish former racing cyclist. She finished in second place in the Finnish National Road Race Championships in 2007.

References

External links

1977 births
Living people
Finnish female cyclists
Place of birth missing (living people)